Patrick Ryan (16 November 1898 – 21 January 1944), also known as Paddy Ryan Lacken, was an Irish nationalist and politician. He was born in Newport, County Tipperary.

Ryan became active in the Irish War of Independence in Limerick and Tipperary, serving as Captain in the C Company of the 6th Battalion, Tipperary No. 1 Brigade, 3rd South Division of the IRA.  He took the Anti-Treaty side in the Irish Civil War, and was arrested by Pro-Treaty forces in 1923. In his Civil War memoir The Gates Flew Open, Peadar O'Donnell describes an incident where Ryan, under sentence of execution, was mistakenly transferred to Harepark Camp in the Curragh. When the order came to hand him over, he was kept hidden by his fellow prisoners.

He was elected to Dáil Éireann as a Sinn Féin Teachta Dála (TD) for the Tipperary constituency at the 1923 general election. He did not take his seat in the Dáil due to Sinn Féin's abstentionist policy. He did not contest the June 1927 general election. 

He emigrated to the US, where he became a businessman, still supporting Irish nationalist campaigns, he died in America on 21 January 1944.

His family were involved in Irish nationalism and the GAA; his father was a local GAA official. His uncle was the priest and GAA figure Canon Michael Kennedy Ryan, and his brother Martin Ryan served as a Fianna Fáil TD for Tipperary from 1933 to 1943.
 
Newport GAA's Lacken Park is named after him.

References

1898 births
1944 deaths
Early Sinn Féin TDs
Members of the 4th Dáil
Politicians from County Tipperary
People of the Irish Civil War (Anti-Treaty side)